Sergey Malchenko (born 2 November 1963) is a Russian former track and field athlete who competed in the high jump. His personal best mark of  ranks him among the top twenty high jumpers of all-time and at his peak his was the sixth best ever in the event.

He represented the Soviet Union three times in major international competition: he was the silver medallist at the European Athletics Championships in 1986, and a finalist at the 1987 World Championships in Athletics and 1989 European Athletics Indoor Championships.

Career
He began competing in the 1980s. His first international success came at the 1986 European Athletics Championships, where he equalled his personal best in the high jump final to take the silver medal behind Soviet team mate Igor Paklin. The following year he was selected to represent the Soviet Union at the 1987 World Championships in Athletics but, after qualifying for the final he failed to register a height. The two other Soviets in the competition, Paklin and Hennadiy Avdyeyenko, reached the medal podium.

Following this setback, he went on to clear the greatest heights of his career. At the beginning of the 1988 indoor season he jumped  in Moscow and took his first national title at the Soviet Indoor Athletics Championships. In Banská Bystrica, Czechoslovakia, he had the best mark of his career in the form of a  jump – an achievement which moved him up to joint sixth place on the all-time lists. This made him the second best athlete that year, behind Javier Sotomayor who broke the men's high jump world record. He ended the year with a win at the Russian Athletics Cup in Vladivostok, jumping .

He competed on the IAAF Grand Prix circuit in 1990 and placed third at the DN Galan and second at the Athletissima and London Grand Prix meets. He was third on points on the tour that year, behind Hollis Conway and Georgi Dakov.

He ranked within the top twenty high jumpers in 1991, having a season's best of 2.30 m.

Personal bests
Outdoor high jump –  (1988)
Indoor high jump –  (1988)

International competition record

References

External links

Living people
1968 births
Russian male high jumpers
Soviet male high jumpers
World Athletics Championships athletes for the Soviet Union
European Athletics Championships medalists